Horā (Sanskrit: होरा)) is a branch of the Indian system of astrology known as .

The various aspects of hora are:
 Jātaka Shāstra (Natal astrology): Prediction based on individual horoscope.
 Muhurta or Muhurtha (Electional astrology): Selection of beneficial time to initiate an activity to get maximum fruition from the life activities.
 Swara Shāstra (Phonetical astrology): Predictions based on name & sounds.
 Prashna (Horary astrology): Predictions based on time when a question is asked by querent / querist.
 Ankjyotish / Kabala (Numerology): A branch of astrology based on numbers.
 Nadi Astrology: An ancient treatise having detailed predictions for individuals.
 Tajika Shāstra / Varsha Phal (Annual Horoscopy): Astrology based on annual solar returns.
 Jaimini Sutras: A non-conventional method of timing of events used by Indian astrologer Acharya Jaimini.
 Nastjātakam (Lost Horoscopy): Art of tracing / construction of lost horoscopes.
 Streejātaka (female astrology): A special branch of astrology dealing with female nativities.
 Graha Samudriki (Astro-Palmistry): Palm reading as horoscope.
 Hasta Rekha / Samudrika Shāstra (Palmistry): Based on palm reading.
 Padatala Shāstra (Plantarology): Based on reading of lines & signs on the sole.
 Shakuna Shāstra (Omens): Predictions based on omens & portents.
 Swapna Vidya : Interpretation of dreams.
 Kapala Vidya (Phrenology)
 Ākriti Vidya (Physiognomy): Based on structure & moles on the body.
 Kerala Jyotisha: Predictions based on querrist reply regarding name of flower or colour or touching part of body.
 Remedial Astrology: Various modes of propitiation of planets based on planetary positions in nativity, transits, elections & for religious functions.

See also
Horology
Hindu astrology

Notes

Hindu astrology